Events from the year 1922 in Denmark.

Incumbents
 Monarch – Christian X
 Prime minister – Niels Neergaard

Events

 21-23 June  The foundation stone for the Dante Column on Danttes Plads in Copenhagen  is set.

Sports

Undated
 KB wins their fifth Danish football championship by defeating B 1901 42 in the final of the 1921–22 Danish National Football Tournament.

Births
 9 March – Count Flemming Valdemar of Rosenborg (died 2002 in France)
 12 June – Leif Thybo, composer (died 2001)
 17 June  Lisbet Dæhlin, ceramist (doed 2012)
 19 June – Aage Bohr, nuclear physicist and Nobel Prize laureate (died 2009]])
 3 July
 Viggo Rivad, photographer (died 2016)
 Anker Jørgensen, politician, prime minister of Denmark (died 2016)

Deaths
 22 January  – Fredrik Bajer, writer (born 1837)
 9 February – Harald Krenchel, fencer (born 1884)
 14 April – Johannes Emil Gnudtzmann, architect (born 1837)
 9 May – Charlotte Eilersgaard, author and editor (born 1858)
 21 May  Alfred Benzon, pharmacist and industrialist (born 1855)
 4 September – Frederik Jacobsen, actor (born 1876)
 22 September – Ida Falbe-Hansen, educator and women's activist (born 1849)
 4 December – Hermann Baagøe Storck, architect (born 1839)

References

 
Denmark
Years of the 20th century in Denmark
1920s in Denmark